Aster Tesfaye (born 27 October 1990) is a Bahraini long-distance runner. She competed in the marathon event at the 2015 World Championships in Athletics in Beijing, China.

References

External links

1990 births
Living people
Bahraini female long-distance runners
Bahraini female marathon runners
World Athletics Championships athletes for Bahrain
Place of birth missing (living people)
Athletes (track and field) at the 2010 Asian Games
Asian Games competitors for Bahrain